Bürgeralpe is a mountain in Lower Austria that overlooks Mariazell with an elevation of 1270m. It can be seen from Hochbarnek as one of the furthest mountains away.

Mountains of Styria
Northern Limestone Alps